Brynjel Andersen Gjerager (1761 – 27 January 1838) was a Norwegian farmer who served as a representative at the Norwegian Constitutional Assembly.

Brynjel Andersen Gjerager was born in Voss in Hordaland, Norway. In his home village, he served for many years a member of the Settlement Commission  (forlikskommissaer) which mediated private disputes. He also held other appointment positions in the parish.

He represented Søndre Bergenhus amt (now Hordaland) at the Norwegian Constituent Assembly at Eidsvoll in 1814. He joined fellow representatives Georg Burchard Jersin and  Arnoldus von Westen Sylow Koren. At Eidsvoll, all three representatives supported the position of the independence party (Selvstendighetspartiet).

References

External links
Representantene på Eidsvoll 1814 (Cappelen Damm AS)
 Men of Eidsvoll (eidsvollsmenn)

Related Reading
Holme Jørn (2014) De kom fra alle kanter - Eidsvollsmennene og deres hus  (Oslo: Cappelen Damm) 

1761 births
1838 deaths
People from Voss
Norwegian farmers
Hordaland politicians
Fathers of the Constitution of Norway